Amor a la española is a 1967 Spanish romantic comedy musical directed  by Fernando Merino and script written by Alfonso Paso. It is based on the story by José Luis Dibildos.

Cast
 José Luis López Vázquez as Francisco Paco Lafuente
 Manolo Gómez Bur as Patricio Ruiz
 Alfredo Landa as Rafa
 Erika Wallner as Ingrid
 Elena María Tejeiro
 Margot Cottens
 Pastor Serrador
 Alfonso Paso as Van Criep
 Laura Valenzuela as Marianne Leroix
 Kia Nelke
 Sara Guasch
 Montserrat Noé
 Fernando Nogueras
 José Luis Coll
 Diana Sorel

External links
 

1967 films
1960s Spanish-language films
1967 romantic comedy films
Spanish romantic comedy films
Argentine romantic comedy films
Films directed by Fernando Merino
1967 musical comedy films
1960s romantic musical films
1960s Spanish films